Shamar Bailey is a retired American mixed martial artist who competed in the Lightweight division. A professional MMA competitor since 2006, Bailey has formerly competed for the UFC, Strikeforce, Bellator, M-1 Global, and was a competitor on The Ultimate Fighter: Team Lesnar vs. Team dos Santos.

Background
The son of a devoted pastor father, Shamar Bailey was raised in a strict Christian household which moved him across state lines six times before his 20th birthday. These moves were due to his dad's full-time corporate re-locations.  Bailey was homeschooled until his senior year of high school when he elected to attend the local Greenwood, Indiana, public school. During his senior season at Center Grove High School, Bailey excelled on the varsity wrestling team, going undefeated over the course of the year. After high school, Bailey attended Maranatha Bible College and majored in church-ministry.

Mixed martial arts career

Early career
Building on his impressive senior year at Center Grove, Bailey entered Division III Maranatha Baptist Bible College in Wisconsin where he continued to thrive on the mats, earning All-Conference three times and being named NCAA National Qualifier. The Church Ministries major returned to Indianapolis after graduation and began to train with Jake O'Brien and Chris Lytle to stay active as he mulled over an offer to move to Colorado Springs to train at the Olympic Training Center with the World Team training camp. Bailey began to feel more comfortable in the sport and decided to decline the invitation in order to pursue mixed martial arts and soon after, in 2006, Bailey had his first professional fight, a first-round TKO victory over Jason Cook.

For the past four years, Bailey has trained with Integrated Fighting Academy while also working part-time for the Indianapolis Fire Department with Chris Lytle. During this time, he has earned notable victories over John Kolosci and Waachiim Spiritwolf.

Strikeforce
Bailey made his Strikeforce on November 7, 2009, when he faced John Kolosci at Strikeforce: Fedor vs. Rogers. He won his debut via unanimous decision. Bailey then replaced an injured Bryan Travers, as he fought Justin Wilcox at Strikeforce Challengers 7 on March 26, 2010. He lost via unanimous decision and was subsequently released.

The Ultimate Fighter
In 2011, it was announced that Bailey had signed with the UFC to compete in The Ultimate Fighter: Team Lesnar vs. Team dos Santos.

Bailey was picked first on Team dos Santos and second overall. In the first preliminary bout of the season, Bailey was selected to fight Nordin Asrih. Bailey used his wrestling to control Asrih on the ground and win a clear-cut decision.

In the quarterfinals, he fought Chris Cope but lost via unanimous decision after two rounds. After the fight Shamar was visibly upset with the decision, saying numerous times, "he fought well, but not that good".

Ultimate Fighting Championship
Even though he lost in the quarterfinals, Bailey remained signed after the show. He made his official UFC debut June 4, 2011 on The Ultimate Fighter 13 Finale card, fighting against fellow quarterfinalist and teammate, Ryan McGillivray. He won the fight via unanimous decision.

Bailey dropped to Lightweight in order to face Evan Dunham at UFC Fight Night 25.  He lost the fight via unanimous decision.

Bailey faced Danny Castillo on November 19, 2011 at UFC 139. During the official weigh ins, Bailey failed to make the weight limit for the Lightweight division. Bailey came in three pounds over, which resulted being fined 20 percent of his earnings, and the bout took place at a Catchweight of 158 lb.  He lost the fight via TKO in the first round. After the loss to Castillo, Bailey was released from the promotion.

Post UFC
Bailey was scheduled to face UFC veteran Karo Parisyan at ShoFight 20 on June 16, 2012 for the vacant ShoFight Welterweight Championship. However, due to a medical suspension, Bailey was pulled from the fight and replaced by John Gunderson

Xtreme Fighting Championships
Bailey faced Bellator veteran Luis Santos at XFC 23 on April 19, 2013. He lost the fight via TKO at just over a minute into the first round.

Retirement
On October 7, 2014, Bailey announced his retirement from MMA competition.

Mixed martial arts record

|-
|  Loss
| align=center| 16–11
| Mark Stoddard
| TKO (punches)
| Pinnacle Combat XVII
| 
| align=center| 1
| align=center| 1:44
| Cedar Rapids, Iowa, United States
| 
|-
|  Loss
| align=center| 16–10
| Kevin Nowaczyk
| Decision (unanimous)
| HFC 19
| 
| align=center| 3
| align=center| 5:00
| Valparaiso, Indiana, United States
| 
|-
|  Win
| align=center| 16–9
| Jordin Hinman
| Decision (unanimous)
| APFC 11: Champion vs. Champion
| 
| align=center| 3
| align=center| 5:00
| McCook, Illinois, United States
| 
|-
|  Loss
| align=center| 15–9
| Luis Santos
| TKO (head kick and punches)
| XFC 23: Louisville Slugfest 
| 
| align=center| 1
| align=center| 1:02
| Louisville, Kentucky, United States
| 
|-
|  Win
| align=center| 15–8
| Gideon Ray
| Decision (unanimous)
| Flawless FC 2: Hated
| 
| align=center| 3
| align=center| 5:00
| Chicago, Illinois, United States
| 
|-
|  Win
| align=center| 14–8
| David Overfield
| TKO (punches)
| Colosseum Combat 22
| 
| align=center| 2
| align=center| 0:18
| Kokomo, Indiana, United States
| 
|-
|  Loss
| align=center| 13–8
| Joshua Williams
| Submission (armbar)
| Warfare 6 - Fight Night
| 
| align=center| 2
| align=center| 2:25
| Myrtle Beach, South Carolina, United States
| 
|-
|  Loss
| align=center| 13–7
| Lucas Pimenta Borges
| TKO (punches)
| Ultimate Warrior Fighting: Tournament of Warriors
| 
| align=center| 1
| align=center| 2:30
| Corpus Christi, Texas, United States
| 
|-
| Loss
| align=center| 13–6
| Josh Shockley
| Decision (unanimous)
| Bellator 60
| 
| align=center| 3
| align=center| 5:00
| Hammond, Indiana, United States
| 
|-
|  Win
| align=center| 13–5
| Darrell Smith
| Submission (D'arce choke)
| Colosseum Combat XIX
| 
| align=center| 3
| align=center| 3:53
| Kokomo, Indiana, United States
| 
|-
|  Loss
| align=center| 12–5
| Danny Castillo
| TKO (punches)
| UFC 139
| 
| align=center| 1
| align=center| 4:52
| San Jose, California, United States
| 
|-
|  Loss
| align=center| 12–4
| Evan Dunham
| Decision (unanimous)
| UFC Fight Night: Shields vs. Ellenberger
| 
| align=center| 3
| align=center| 5:00
| New Orleans, Louisiana, United States
| 
|-
| Win
| align=center| 12–3
| Ryan McGillivray
| Decision (unanimous)
| The Ultimate Fighter 13 Finale
| 
| align=center| 3
| align=center| 5:00
| Las Vegas, Nevada, United States
| 
|-
| Loss
| align=center| 11–3
| Kurt Kinser
| TKO (cut)
| LOF 41: Damage Incorporated
| 
| align=center| 1
| align=center| 5:00
| Indianapolis, Indiana, United States
| 
|-
| Loss
| align=center| 11–2
| Justin Wilcox
| Decision (unanimous)
| Strikeforce Challengers: Johnson vs. Mahe
| 
| align=center| 3
| align=center| 5:00
| Fresno, California, United States
| 
|-
| Win
| align=center| 11–1
| John Kolosci
| Decision (unanimous)
| Strikeforce: Fedor vs. Rogers
| 
| align=center| 3
| align=center| 5:00
| Hoffman Estates, Illinois, United States
| 
|-
| Win
| align=center| 10–1
| Raymond Jarman
| TKO (punches)
| M-1 Challenge 18: Netherlands Day Two
| 
| align=center| 2
| align=center| 3:15
| Hilversum, Netherlands
| 
|-
| Win
| align=center| 9–1
| Rodney Sleepers
| Decision (unanimous)
| KOTC: The Renewal
| 
| align=center| 3
| align=center| 5:00
| Indianapolis, Indiana, United States
| 
|-
| Win
| align=center| 8–1
| James George
| Submission (guillotine choke)
| UFL: Fight Night at The Murat
| 
| align=center| 1
| align=center| 2:04
| Indianapolis, Indiana, United States
| 
|-
| Loss
| align=center| 7–1
| Roger Bowling
| TKO (punches)
| RFL: Hostile Takeover
| 
| align=center| 1
| align=center| 0:28
| Louisville, Kentucky, United States
| 
|-
| Win
| align=center| 7–0
| Gabriel Miranda
| DQ
| Warriors Collide 2
| 
| align=center| 3
| align=center| 3:30
| Pueblo, Colorado, United States
| 
|-
| Win
| align=center| 6–0
| Waachiim Spiritwolf
| Decision (unanimous)
| Revolution Fight League 1
| 
| align=center| 3
| align=center| 5:00
| Louisville, Kentucky, United States
| 
|-
| Win
| align=center| 5–0
| Matt Delanoit
| Decision (unanimous)
| UFL: Fight Night at Conseco Fieldhouse
| 
| align=center| 3
| align=center| 5:00
| Indianapolis, Indiana, United States
| 
|-
| Win
| align=center| 4–0
| Mike Firari
| TKO (punches)
| Madtown Throwdown 10
| 
| align=center| N/A
| align=center| N/A
| Madison, Wisconsin, United States
| 
|-
| Win
| align=center| 3–0
| Salazar Sanchez
| TKO (punches)
| LOF 12: Black Tie Battles
| 
| align=center| 2
| align=center| 2:39
| Indianapolis, Indiana, United States
| 
|-
| Win
| align=center| 2–0
| Courtney Ray
| Submission
| United Fight League 3
| 
| align=center| 1
| align=center| N/A
| Indianapolis, Indiana, United States
| 
|-
| Win
| align=center| 1–0
| Jason Cook
| TKO (punches)
| United Fight League 2
| 
| align=center| 1
| align=center| N/A
| Indianapolis, Indiana, United States
|

Amateur mixed martial arts record

|Win
|align=center| 1–0
|Rod Montoya
|Decision (unanimous)
|United Fight League 1
|
|align=center| 3
|align=center| 5:00
|Indianapolis, Indiana, United States
|

References

External links

1982 births
Living people
American male mixed martial artists
Mixed martial artists from Illinois
Welterweight mixed martial artists
Lightweight mixed martial artists
Mixed martial artists utilizing wrestling
Sportspeople from Chicago
People from Greenwood, Indiana
Ultimate Fighting Championship male fighters